Chondropoma is a genus of small operculate land snails, terrestrial gastropods in the subfamily Chondropomatinae  of the family Annulariidae.

Distribution 
Distribution of Chondropoma include Cuba, Nicaragua, the Dominican Republic  ...

63 species of Chondropoma lives in Cuba.

Species
Species within the genus Chondropoma include:
 Chondropoma abnatum (Gundlach in Pfeiffer, 1858)
 Chondropoma abtianum (Pfeiffer, 1862)
 Chondropoma aguayoi Torre & Bartsch, 1938
 Chondropoma alayoi Aguayo & Jaume, 1957
 Chondropoma alberti Clench & Aguayo, 1948
 Chondropoma alcaldei Jaume & Sánchez de Fuentes, 1943
 Chondropoma antonense Torre & Bartsch, 1938
 Chondropoma aspratile (Morelet, 1873)
 Chondropoma asperulum Aguayo, 1934
 Chondropoma auberianum (d’Orbigny, 1842)
 Chondropoma bairense Torre & Bartsch, 1938
 Chondropoma cabrerai Torre & Bartsch, 1938
 Chondropoma callipeplum Solem, 1961
 Chondropoma carenasense Pilsbry & Henderson, 1912
 Chondropoma cleti Aguayo, 1939
 Chondropoma cognatum Torre & Bartsch, 1938
 Chondropoma confertum (Poey, 1852)
 Chondropoma chordatum (Gundlach in Pfeiffer, 1858)
 Chondropoma daudinoti (Gundlach in Pfeiffer, 1860)
 Chondropoma delatreanum (d’Orbigny, 1842)
 Chondropoma dilatatum (Gundlach in Pfeiffer, 1859)
 Chondropoma eduardoi Aguayo, 1934
 Chondropoma erectum (Gundlach in Pfeiffer, 1858)
 Chondropoma ernesti Pfeiffer, 1862
 Chondropoma fuentesi Jaume & Alcalde, 1944
 Chondropoma garcianum Torre, 1913
 Chondropoma greenfieldi Torre & Bartsch, 1938
 Chondropoma guisaense Torre & Bartsch, 1938
 Chondropoma gutierrezi (Gundlach in Pfeiffer, 1856)
 Chondropoma holguinense (Aguayo, 1944)
 Chondropoma irradians (Robert J. Shuttleworth in Pfeiffer, 1852)
 Chondropoma jaulense Torre & Bartsch, 1938
 Chondropoma laetum (Gutierrez in Poey, 1858)
 Chondropoma lembeyi Torre & Bartsch, 1938
 Chondropoma leoni Torre & Bartsch, 1938
 Chondropoma marginalbum (Gundlach in Pfeiffer, 1859)
 Chondropoma moestum (Robert J. Shuttleworth in Pfeiffer, 1854)
 Chondropoma montanum Torre & Bartsch, 1938
 Chondropoma neglectum (Gundlach in Pfeiffer, 1856)
 Chondropoma nicolasi Torre & Bartsch, 1938
 Chondropoma nigriculum (Gundlach, 1860)
 Chondropoma obesum (Menke, 1830)
 Chondropoma oxytremum (Gundlach in Pfeiffer, 1860)
 Chondropoma perlatum (Gundlach in Poey, 1858)
 Chondropoma pfeifferi Aguayo, 1945
 Chondropoma pfeifferianum (Poey, 1851)
 Chondropoma pictum (Pfeiffer, 1839)
 Chondropoma poeyanum (d’Orbigny, 1842)
 Chondropoma portuandoi Torre & Bartsch, 1938
 Chondropoma presasianum (Gundlach, 1863)
 Chondropoma revinctum (Poey, 1851)
 Chondropoma revocatum (Gundlach in Pfeiffer, 1857)
 Chondropoma rolandoi Aguayo, 1943
 Chondropoma rufilabre (Potiez & Michaud, 1838)
 Chondropoma rufopictum (Gundlach in Pfeiffer, 1860)
 Chondropoma solidulum (Gundlach in Pfeiffer, 1860)
 Chondropoma tejedori Clench & Aguayo, 1946
 Chondropoma tenuisculptum Aguayo, 1939
 Chondropoma textum (Gundlach in Pfeiffer, 1858)
 Chondropoma unilabiatum (Gundlach in Pfeiffer, 1860)
 Chondropoma vespertinum (Morelet, 1851)
 Chondropoma virgineum Aguayo, 1953
 Chondropoma wilcoxi Pilsbry & Henderson, 1912
 Chondropoma wrighti (Pfeiffer, 1862)
 Chondropoma yucayum (Presas in Pfeiffer, 1863)
 Chondropoma zorrillae Jaume, 1984

References

Annulariidae
Gastropod genera
Taxonomy articles created by Polbot